Shoot for the Moon may refer to: 

 Shoot for the Moon (song), by Poco, 1982
 Shoot for the Moon (album), by Linda Davis, 1994

See also
 Shoot for the Stars, Aim for the Moon, a 2020 studio album by Pop Smoke